The 2013 Campeonato Acreano was the 68th season of the Campeonato Acreano, the top professional football league of the state of Acre. Rio Branco were champions for the 44th time. The championship started 16 March, 2014, and ended on 10 June.

Format
The first stage is in double round-robin. The best four teams qualify to Final Stage.

The champion and the runner-up qualify to the 2015 Copa do Brasil. The best team on the final standing also qualifies to the 2014 Campeonato Brasileiro Série D.

Teams

Náuas initially joined to replace Galvez, which had financial issues. However, as Juventus-AC withdrew, Galvez was invited back to the championship.

First stage

Results

Final stage

References

Acreano
Campeonato Acreano seasons